The British Aircraft B.A.IV Double Eagle was a British twin-engined six-seater monoplane designed and built by the British Aircraft Manufacturing Company of London Air Park, Hanworth, England.

Design and development
The Double Eagle was a twin-engined high-wing monoplane with a retractable landing gear, the main gear retracting backwards into the engine nacelles. The first aircraft (Y-1) was powered by two 130 hp (97 kW) de Havilland Gipsy Major engines, and it first flew from Hanworth on 3 July 1936, later registered G-ADVV. The second aircraft (G-AEIN) was fitted with two de Havilland Gipsy VIs. Three aircraft were built, although one citation is claimed to say that only two Double Eagles were produced, and that both were impressed by the RAF.

Operational history
In 1940, the first aircraft (G-ADVV) was impressed into the Royal Air Force as ES949, and was finally used as an instructional airframe by Armstrong-Whitworth, and later Parnall.

On 29 September 1936, the second aircraft (G-AEIN), piloted by Tommy Rose, took off in the Schlesinger Race (from Portsmouth to Johannesburg). It was retired when it suffered damage at Almaza Airfield (Cairo), due to collapse of the undercarriage.
 In 1940, it was impressed into the RAF as ES950, and ended its life in 1941 as an instructional airframe.

The third aircraft (ZS-AIY) was sold to the Aircraft Operating Company in South Africa as an aerial surveying aircraft, and was then re-registered ZS-AOC. In 1940, it was impressed into service with 60 Squadron of the South African Air Force as serial number 1415.

Operators

South African Air Force, one only.

Royal Air Force, two.

Specifications (with Gipsy Major)

See also

References

Notes

Bibliography

1930s British civil utility aircraft
Double Eagle
High-wing aircraft
Aircraft first flown in 1936
Twin piston-engined tractor aircraft